Sergei Rachmaninoff composed two works titled Morceaux de salon:

 Morceaux de salon, Op. 6 for violin and piano
 Morceaux de salon, Op. 10 for piano solo